Steffi Menning (born 2 January 1971) is a German former professional tennis player.

Menning, who was born in Oberstdorf, was an Orange Bowl doubles finalist in 1987 and won the 1988 German National Indoor Championships.

On the professional tour, she reached a best singles ranking of 188 in the world. She qualified for the main draw of the 1990 Australian Open and was beaten in the first round by Audra Keller, in three sets.

ITF finals

Singles (1–0)

Doubles (1–0)

References

External links
 
 

1971 births
Living people
West German female tennis players
German female tennis players
People from Oberstdorf
Sportspeople from Swabia (Bavaria)
Tennis people from Bavaria